The Chocón Machacas River is a river in eastern Guatemala. From there it flows in a generally west-south-west direction into the Golfete Dulce. The Chocón Machacas river and Golfete Dulce complex form one of Guatemala's few remaining habitats for the endangered Caribbean manatee (Trichechus manatus).

References

Rivers of Guatemala